Susan Blanchard may refer to:

Susan Blanchard (socialite) (born 1928), who married actors Henry Fonda, Michael Wager, and Richard Widmark
Susan Blanchard (actress) (born 1944), American actress known for role on All My Children in the 1970s
Blanchard Ryan (Susan Blanchard Ryan, born 1967), American actress who starred in the 2003 film Open Water